Flohr is a surname. Notable people with the surname include:

 Bruce Flohr, founder of RailTex
 Salo Flohr, Czech-Jewish chess grandmaster
 Thomas Flohr, Swiss billionaire, founder of VistaJet
 Nina Flohr, Swiss businesswoman and member of the Greek royal family

See also
 Paul R. Mendes-Flohr
 Op Flohr Stadion

ru:Флор